

History
The institution was established by Mrs. Veena Mathur in 1996, as the Rakshpal Bahadur Management Institute, with the goal to provide engineering & management education. Rakshpal Bahadur College of Engineering and Technology originally had three colleges:
 Rakshpal Bahadur  Management Institute (RBMI) established in 1996, a management institute affiliated to Dr. A.P.J. Abdul Kalam Technical University (previously Uttar Pradesh Technical University)
 Rakshpal Bahadur College of Pharmacy (RBCP) established in 2002, a pharmacy college affiliated to Dr. A.P.J. Abdul Kalam Technical University (previously Uttar Pradesh Technical University)
 RBMI Business School (RBMIBS) established in 2004, management institute approved by All India Council for Technical Education (AICTE)
 Rakshpal Bahadur College of Engineering and Technology (RBCET)  admitted its first cohort in 2008. 
Apart from academics RBCET has always indulged in publishing and other activities providing their students market and industry interactions. RBCET campus, located near ITBP / Doordarshan Kendra, Badaun Road, Bareilly, six kilometers away from Bareilly railway station

Infrastructure

Campus
RBCET campus is located at Bareilly.

Computer laboratories and network
The institute has around 400 computers distributed over four academic blocks. The department of Computer Science has signed an MSDN alliance with Microsoft for facilitating free use of Microsoft products for the students and faculty

Library
2500 reference & text books                                          *More than 110 International/National Journals
Digital Library                                                      *Year books
US, British & Indian Pharmacopeia                                    *More than 675 Academic & Training Video Cassettes/CDs
470 on-line National & International Journals                        *9 dailies
Management, IT & Education Encyclopedia reprographics facility       *Separate libraries for every Department
The institute subscribes to leading Indian & International Journals and a system of cross-referred access to information

Courses
The institute offers Bachelor of Technology (B.Tech) degree courses in the following branches

Engineering colleges in Uttar Pradesh
Private engineering colleges in Uttar Pradesh
Education in Bareilly
Dr. A.P.J. Abdul Kalam Technical University
2016 establishments in Uttar Pradesh
Educational institutions established in 2016